Genma may refer to:

Literature 
 Genma Taisen (幻魔大戦), a science fiction manga series that began in 1967

Characters 
 Genma (Onimusha), recurring enemies and race of monsters in the Onimusha video game series
 Genma (Ranma ½) (早乙女 玄馬), a character in the anime and manga series Ranma ½
 Genma, a character in the Battle Arena Toshinden fighting game series
 Himuro Genma, the main villain from the Ninja Scroll movie
 Genma Shiranui, a character in the anime and manga series Naruto
 Genma Kannagi, a character in the light novel and anime series Kaze no Stigma